Pope Stephen may refer to any of several men who were Pope or who were elected Pope of the Roman Catholic Church.  Historically, there have been two regnal numbering systems used when referring to Popes called "Stephen" starting with Pope-elect Stephen.  See Pope-elect Stephen for detailed explanation.

 Pope Stephen I (died 257), Bishop of Rome from 254 to 257
 Pope-elect Stephen (died 752), also known as Pope Stephen II, elected Pope but died before his consecration
 Pope Stephen II (III) (died 757), pope from 752 to 757
 Pope Stephen III (IV) (720–772), pope from 768 to 772
 Pope Stephen IV (V) (died 817), pope from 816 to 817
 Pope Stephen V (VI) (died 891), pope from 885 to 891
 Pope Stephen VI (VII) (died 897), pope from 896 to 897
 Pope Stephen VII (VIII) (died 931), pope from 929 to 931
 Pope Stephen VIII (IX) (died 942), pope from 939 to 942
 Pope Stephen IX (X) (c. 1020–1058), pope from 1057 to 1058

See also
Stephen Pope (disambiguation)

Stephen